Vangsmjøse (also spelled as Vangsmjøsa or Vangsmjøsi) is a lake in Vang Municipality in Innlandet county, Norway. A local myth says that if a raw ham is lowered into the deepest part of Vangsmjøse, it will be boiled when it is pulled back up.

Øye Stave Church is situated in the village of Øye which sits at the west end of Vangsmjøse. The scenic European route E16 runs through Øye and along the south shore of Vangsmjøse.

Media gallery

See also 
 List of lakes in Norway

References

External links 
 Region description
 Vang description with discussion of Lake Vangsmjøse

Vang, Innlandet
Lakes of Innlandet